Nassach may refer to:

Nassach (Fils), a river of Baden-Württemberg, Germany, tributary of the Fils
Nassach (Main), a river of Bavaria, Germany, tributary of the Main
Nassach, a village belonging to Spiegelberg, a town in Baden-Württemberg in Germany
Nassach, a village belonging to Aidhausen, a municipality in Bavaria in Germany